The Spain men's national junior ice hockey team is the national men's junior under-20 ice hockey team of Spain. The team is controlled by the Federación Española de Deportes de Hielo, a member of the International Ice Hockey Federation.

History
Spain played its first game in 1984 against Great Britain during the Pool C tournament of the 1984 IIHF World U20 Championship. Spain won the game 7–3 and finished the tournament in fourth place. After competing in their second World U20 Championships in 1985 Spain did not send a team for the 1986 IIHF World U20 Championship. Spain returned to compete in the Pool C tournament at the 1987 IIHF World U20 Championship. During the 1988 tournament Spain had their largest defeat in international participation after being beaten by Denmark 0–19. Spain did not send a team to the following three World U20 Championship and but returned to the Pool C tournament for the 1992 IIHF World U20 Championship. They continued to compete in the Pool C tournament until 1996 when their finished last in the Pool and were relegated to Pool D for the following years World Championships. During the Pool D tournament of the 1997 IIHF World U20 Championship Spain achieved their largest win in international participation when they defeated Mexico 13–1. Spain continued to compete in Pool D until 2001 when the International Ice Hockey Federation changed the format of the World U20 Championship and Spain was reseeded into the Division III tournament. In 2002 Spain was promoted to Division II following the 2002 Division III tournament due to a restructuring which saw all Division III teams promoted to Division II. Spain has continued to compete in Division II and in 2013 finished sixth in the Division II Group A tournament being held in Brașov, Romania. Following their sixth-place finish they were relegated to Division II Group B for the following year.

Juan Munoz currently holds the team record for most points with 33. Munoz competed in four IIHF World U20 Championship from 2007 to 2010 with his best result in 2010 where he scored 11 goals and six assists in the Division II Group A tournament at the 2010 IIHF World U20 Championship.

International competitions

References

External links
Federación Española de Deportes de Hielo 

Ice hockey teams in Spain
Junior national ice hockey teams
Ice hockey